Sindhudesh is an idea of a separate homeland for Sindhis proposed by Sindhi nationalist parties for the creation of a Sindhi state, which would be either autonomous within Pakistan or independent from it. The movement is based in the Sindh region of Pakistan and was conceived by the Sindhi political leader G. M. Syed after the independence of Bangladesh. He gave a new direction to Sindhi nationalism, founded the Jeay Sindh Tehreek in 1972 and presented the idea of Sindhudesh.  Sindhi nationalists sometimes claims the Kutch region of India, the Lasbela District of Balochistan, and sometimes southern Punjab (particularly the Saraiki speaking regions.)

Sindhi separatists reject the parliamentary path of struggle for attaining freedom and rights. No Sindhi nationalist party has been ever voted into power in Sindh at any level of government. In recent years, several Sindhi nationalists have deserted the ideology and joined mainstream politics due to disillusionment within ranks, lack of public support, and crackdowns by law enforcement agencies. Some nationalist parties and associations are banned for alleged "terrorist, anti-state and sabotage" activities by the Pakistani government.

Sindh is the member of UNPO and it is represented in UNPO by the World Sindhi Congress, which is responsible for highlighting issues facing Sindh.

History and Diaspora

Historical Kingdom 

According to the epic Mahabharata, Sindhudesh, translated as the Sindhu Kingdom, was the ancient name for modern Sindh.

History of the Movement 
In 1972 G. M. Syed proposed the formation of an independent nation for the Sindhis under the name Sindhudesh. He was the first nationalist politician in Pakistan to call for the independence of Sindh in a Pakistan. The movement for Sindhi language and identity led by Syed drew inspiration from the Bengali language movement. In post independence Pakistan, the strategy followed by the Pakistani state led Syed to come to a conclusion that the Sindhis would not be given due importance in the country.

With his political base largely weakened after election, Syed later advanced his position towards openly demanding separation from Pakistan and the build-up of an independent Sindhudesh in his books Heenyar Pakistan khey tuttan khappey (Now Pakistan Should Disintegrate) and Sindhu Desh — A Nation in Chains.

Reemergence of Sindhi Nationalism 
After the assassination of former Prime Minister of Pakistan, Benazir Bhutto, ethnic unrest arose. Sindhi nationalists judged the country was being used to the advantage of people from non-Sindhi ethnic groups, alleged Punjabi dominance in the defence sector. and believe this to be the cause of recent troubles in Sindh (see Sindhi nationalism).

Sindhis in India 

Sindhis in India, most of whom had to be relocated out of Sindh after Partition, leaving behind their property as evacuee trusts under reciprocal government supervision. After the Partition of India, the majority of the minority Hindus and Sikhs in Pakistan migrated to India, while the Muslim migrants from India settled down in Pakistan. Approximately 10 million Hindus and Sikhs migrated to India, while nearly an equal number of Muslims migrated to newly created Pakistan from India. Hindu Sindhis were expected to stay in Sindh following the partition, as there were good relations between Hindu and Muslim Sindhis. At the time of partition there were 1,400,000 Hindu Sindhis, though most were concentrated in cities such as Hyderabad, Karachi, Shikarpur, and Sukkur.

The concept of Sindhudesh is often also supported by Indian Sindhis most of whom want to return to their native homeland Sindh while retaining their lives in India. Suggestions for a Sindhi political party India as an ethnic empowerment movement for the largest minority group in Gujarat and Maharashtra included proposals of separatism and a higher degree of autonomy within the Sindhi community in India. Proposed by prominent individuals Participating in the Chetichand celebration within the Sindhi community in Ahmedabad such as at the time Chief Minister (14th Prime minister of India), Shri Narendra Modi.  Narendra Modi, in his speech gave an example of the Jewish acquisition of Jerusalem and suggested "If those who dream have strength, everything is possible"  The Gandhian carnival at Delhi’s doorsteps won pan-Indian support for Sindhudesh

The concept of Sindhudesh is also supported by some Sindhi diaspora including Sindhis in India, most of whom had to be relocated out of Sindh after Partition, leaving behind their property as evacuee trusts under reciprocal government supervision. Pre-partition, Sindh was a relative peaceful province, with communal violence only erupting sporadically and during partition. This peace stopped after partition, with post-partition migrants to Sindh angry at the "non-co-operation" in the killing of Hindus; and communal hatred multiplied post partition. according to a Sindhi nationalist organisation "The only backdrop for Sindhudesh movement has been the absence of national capitalist because of the migration of Sindhi Hindus from Sindh to India after partition. That’s why Sindhudesh Movement has been lacking economic, political and diplomatic means to start mass uprising against the decades of slavery, humiliation and oppression. Therefore, the independence of Sindh and establishment of secular republic of Sindhudesh is the need of the history and key to regional peace."

Sind United Party 

The Sind United Party or Sind Ittehad Party (Sindhi: سنڌ اتحاد پارٽي) was a political party in Sind, British India. The party was founded in June 1936, the same year that the Sind province had been created. The party was modelled on the Punjab Unionist Party. In the 1937 election to the Sind Legislative Assembly, the party emerged as the largest party with 21 seats in the Assembly and formed a provincial government.

Outfits

Sindhu Desh Liberation Army 

The Sindhu Desh Liberation Army or SDLA is an inactive militant group based in the Sindh province of Pakistan. A series of minor blasts took place on railway lines — the attacks carried out between November 2010, and February 2011 were claimed by the SDLA, who left pamphlets on the scene that mentioned “atrocities” being carried out against Sindh and promising to continue their “struggle” till Sindh was granted “freedom”. The attacks were condemned by fellow Sindhi nationalists such as Dr Qadir Magsi of the Jeay Sindh Tarraqi Passand Party, who warned of negative consequences from violence.

The group is currently 
active.

Jeay Sindh Qaumi Mahaz 

Jeay Sindh Qaumi Mahaz was a “merger/integration” of all the nationalist factions of Jeay Sindh or Sindhudesh movement which was functioning separately before the demise of veteran Sindhi nationalist ideologue GM Syed.

Jeay Sindh Muttahida Mahaz 

JSMM is one of the major separatist political party in Sindh, Pakistan, that believes in the separation of Sindhudesh from Pakistan. Founded in the year 2000, by the veteran Sindhi nationalists belonging to the Sindhudesh movement who left JSQM. The founder and the current Chairman of party Shafi Muhammad Burfat is living in exile in Germany under political asylum.

Jeay Sindh Students' Federation 

Jeay Sindh Students’ Federation is the student wing of various separatist organizations struggling for the freedom of Sindhudesh following the ideology of G. M. Syed, founded in 1969.  JSSF was a nationalist outfit which emerged from Anti-Unitary System Struggle in the late 1960s and later joined G. M. Syed in his ideology of a separate homeland for Sindhis in 1972. Since then, it has been working as the students’ front of the Jeay Sindh or Sindhudesh movement.

Sindh National Movement Party 
A new left wing party for a politically, culturally, economically and geographically independent Sindh was formed in December 2011. It wants to see Sindh as it was in 1843 before the British conquered it and opposes the development of Zulfikarabad, referring to it as a new Israel.

See also
 Human rights abuses in Sindh
Muhajir Sooba
Sindhudesh Liberation Army 
Insurgency in Sindh
History of Sindh
Sindhi nationalism
Insurgency in Khyber Pakhtunkhwa
Sindhis

References

Separatism in Pakistan
Proposed countries